Kevin Fox is the user experience designer who created the interface for Gmail, Google Calendar, Google Reader, and Friendfeed.

He was a co-founder of the Internet of Things startup Electric Imp. Since 2015 he has been the chief experience officer at Evan Prodromou's fuzzy.io.

References

External links 
 Kevin Fox's twitter account, @kfury

Web designers
Gmail
Google employees
Living people
Year of birth missing (living people)
Place of birth missing (living people)